The 1996 IIHF European Women Championships were the sixth and final holding of the IIHF European Women Championships. The tournaments were held in March 1996, with Pool A playing in Yaroslavl, Russia during 23–29 March and Pool B playing in Trnava and Piešťany, Slovakia during 12–16 March.

The format remained unchanged from the previous year, with promoted  replacing relegated  in the Pool A tournament.

The tournament was the final European Championship ever to be held, as the International Ice Hockey Federation expanded the World Championships to include tiered divisions.

European Championship Group A

Teams & Format

Six teams completed in Pool A, with Russia joining the group after winning the 1995 Pool B tournament. The teams were:

 
 
 
 
 
 

A single round-robin tournament was played between the teams, with the top ranked team winning the championship.

Tournament

Standings

Results

Champions

Awards and statistics

Awards 

Best player selected by the Directorate

All-Star team

Scoring leaders 
List shows the top skaters sorted by points, then goals.

GP = Games played; G = Goals; A = Assists; Pts = Points; +/− = Plus/minus; PIM = Penalties in minutes; POS = Position
Source:

Rosters

European Championship Group B

Teams & Format

The eight teams that competed in Pool B were:

 
 
 
 
 
 
 
 

Kazakhstan replaced Ukraine after they withdrew from the competition.

The teams were split into two groups of four teams as below. At the end of the group stage, the teams would play the team that finished in the same position in the opposite group in a playoff match, i.e. Winner of Group A played Winner of Group B for the Gold Medal.

Group A

Standings

Results

Group B

Standings

Results

Playoff round

Consolation round 7–8 place

Consolation round 5–6 place

Match for third place

Final

Final standings

See also
 IIHF European Women Championships

References

IIHF European Women Championships
1995–96 in Russian ice hockey
1995–96 in Slovak ice hockey
Euro
1996 in Russian women's sport
International ice hockey competitions hosted by Russia
International ice hockey competitions hosted by Slovakia
March 1996 sports events in Europe
Sport in Trnava
Sport in Yaroslavl